is a song by Japanese voice actress idol unit Earphones. It was released on July 22, 2015 and was used as the opening for the anime, Seiyu's Life!. The lyrics was written by Seiyu's Life!s manga writer, Masumi Asano and music was composed by Yugo Sasakura. Single B-side, "Anata no Omimi ni Plug In!" was used as the ending for the same anime.

Music video
The video features Rie Takahashi, Yuki Nagaku, and Marika Kouno who are voicing main characters of Seiyu's Life!, performed in a room with many microphones.

Track listing

Charts

Release history

References 

Earphones (band) songs
2015 singles
2015 songs
Anime songs